Pep Le Pew were a five-piece Welsh-language hip-hop group that formed in Porthmadog, Gwynedd in 1999. Their first single, 'Y Mwyafrif' (The Majority) was released on Fitamin Un in 2001, and rapidly garnered critical acclaim; the band released their debut album, Y Da, Y Drwg ac Yr Hyll (The Good, The Bad and the Ugly) on their own label in 2002. In the same year they received the award for Best Newcomers at the BBC Cymru Gwobrau Roc a Phop (Pop and Rock Awards) night. Un Tro Yn Y Gorllewin (One Time In The West) followed on Recordiau Slacyr in 2004, but the band split in 2005. Several members went on to form Genod Droog.

External links
 Bio at BBC Wales

Welsh-language bands